Endotricha erythralis is a species of snout moth in the genus Endotricha. It was described by Paul Mabille in 1900, and is known from Madagascar, South Africa, the Democratic Republic of the Congo and Socotra.

References

Moths described in 1900
Endotrichini
Moths of Madagascar
Insects of the Democratic Republic of the Congo
Invertebrates of the Arabian Peninsula
Moths of Africa